Brigitte Soucy (born October 11, 1972 in Moncton, New Brunswick) is a retired female volleyball player from Canada.

Soucy competed for her native country at the 1996 Summer Olympics in Atlanta, Georgia. There the resident of Winnipeg, Manitoba finished in 10th place with the Women's National Team after having won the bronze medal a year earlier at the Pan American Games.

Living people
Acadian people
Canadian women's volleyball players
Olympic volleyball players of Canada
Pan American Games bronze medalists for Canada
Pan American Games medalists in volleyball
Volleyball players at the 1995 Pan American Games
Volleyball players at the 1996 Summer Olympics
Medalists at the 1995 Pan American Games
1972 births